Henry Dale may refer to:

Henry Hallett Dale (1875–1968), English pharmacologist and physiologist
Henry Dale (MP) for Bristol

See also
Harry Dale (disambiguation)